This is a list of National Historic Sites in the province of Prince Edward Island.  There are 22 National Historic Sites designated in Prince Edward Island, five of which are administered by Parks Canada (identified below by the beaver icon ).  The first National Historic Site to be designated in Prince Edward Island was Jean-Pierre Roma at Three Rivers in 1933.

Numerous National Historic Events also occurred in P.E.I., and are identified at places associated with them, using the same style of federal plaque which marks National Historic Sites. Several National Historic Persons are commemorated throughout the province in the same way. The markers do not indicate which designation—a Site, Event, or Person—a subject has been given.

This list uses names designated by the national Historic Sites and Monuments Board, which may differ from other names for these sites.

National Historic Sites

See also

History of Prince Edward Island
List of historic places in Prince Edward Island

References

 
Prince Edward Island